The 2nd Armoured Division is a unit of the French Army formed during World War II that took part in the May-June 1940 Battle of France.

History 
Formed 16 January 1940 at Haute Moivre. Campaigns: Battle of the Meuse, Fronts of the Aisne and the Somme, Somme Front, Battle of the Somme and Retreat of the Center. Final command post at Saint-Pierre Cherignat, northeast of Limoges. Division subsequently disbanded. Subordination: I Corps of 7th Army until 29 May and then various, including 10th Army, VII Corps, IX Corps, X Corps, 51st British Infantry Division and the Groupement Cuirassée.

Composition 

In May 1940:

 8th Tank Battalion (B1 bis tanks)
 15th Tank Battalion (B1 bis tanks)
 14th Tank Battalion (H39 tanks)
 27th Tank Battalion (H39 tanks)
 17th Motorized Rifle Battalion (bataillon de chasseurs portés)
 309th Artillery Regiment

References

Bibliography 

 (GUF) Service Historique de l'Armée de Terre. Guerre 1939–1945 Les Grandes Unités Françaises. Paris: Imprimerie Nationale, 1967.

French World War II divisions
Armored divisions of France
Military units and formations established in 1940
Military units and formations disestablished in 1940